Mahmudur Rahman Choudhury (1 June 1928 – 24 June 1999) also known as  Major General MR Choudhury, was a medical scientist and physician from Bangladesh who was the founder Commandant of Armed Forces Institute of Pathology and Transfusion (AFIP&T). The Government of Bangladesh awarded him the Independence Day Award, the highest civilian honor in the country, in 1977. The institution Choudhury built up, the AFIP&T also received the same award as a center of excellence later in 1987.

Early life and career
Born on 1 June 1928, in Sylhet, Choudhury graduated from Calcutta Medical College in 1951, as a student of the University of Calcutta and obtained D. Bact. with distinction from the University of London in 1959. He was commissioned in the Pakistan Army Medical Corps in 1952. For his professional excellence as a junior major, Choudhury received a letter of commendation from the Commander in Chief and was honored with the civil award Tamgha-e-Quaide Azam. After the independence of Bangladesh Choudhury played the key role in the establishment of AFIP&T in 1976. He also organized the Bangladesh Society of Microbiologists the same year and was its founder president.

References

1928 births
1999 deaths
Bangladeshi military doctors
University of Calcutta alumni
Bangladesh Army generals
Bangladeshi pathologists
Recipients of the Independence Day Award